Bothrops moojeni, commonly known in English as the Brazilian lancehead, is a species of venomous snake in the  family Viperidae. It is a pit viper endemic to South America.

Etymology
The specific name, moojeni, is in honor of Brazilian zoologist João Moojen de Oliveira (1904–1985).

Description and Behavior 
Grows on average 160 cm, with a maximum of 230 cm already reported, has a tan, gray-brown or olive-gray color, with fourteen to twenty-one trapezoidal side marks that are dark gray or completely black, 23 to 29 lines of dorsal scale of the average body, with the belly usually white or cream with dark gray spots scattered, while juveniles have a white tail. It is terrestrial, of nocturnal habits. 

It is considered very aggressive. Its body is viscous, varying from medium to heavy, broad head, flattened in a lance when seen from above and distinct from the narrow neck, the snout is not elevated, the eyes are medium in size, with elliptical pupils vertically, while the scales back are keeled. B. moojeni is viviparous. Gestation lasts around four months, occurs once a year and 12 to 14 puppies are usually born. Live an average of 15 years. It feeds on small mammals, birds, lizards, snakes and amphibians.

Geographic range and habitat
B. moojeni is found in northern Argentina, eastern Bolivia, Brazil, and Paraguay.

The type locality is Brasília, Distrito Federal, Brazil. B. moojeni inhabits Araucaria moist forests and the Cerrado.

Common names
In South America common names for B. moojeni include caiçaca, caissaca, caiçara, jacuruçu, and jararação.

Venom 
Its venom has hemolytic and proteolytic action. B. moojeni venom contains a wide variety of enzymes, such as acidic phospholipase, base A phospholipase, metalloproteinases, serine proteinases, L-amino acid oxidase, and a myotoxin phospholipase A2. The myotoxin phospholipase A2 causes necrosis in muscle fibers, releasing creatinine kinase.  Symptoms may include intense local pain, edema, muscular necrosis. The venom has an anticoagulant effect on the blood, makes the blood uncoagulable, causes severe hemorrhage and strokes. 

Moojenactivase, a procoagulant metalloproteinase is capable to induce DIC with a high toxic potency, characterized by prolongation of Prothrombin and activated partial thromboplastin time, consumption of fibrinogen and the plasma coagulation factors like Factor X and II, and thrombocytopenia, it also caused Intravascular hemolysis. The venom has a lethal dose of 0.205 mg / kg for horses. The average yield for an adult female is 335 mg, 63 mg for newborns, specimens from Minas Gerais, Brazil have been reported to be 118 mg, specimens from Argentina have a yield of 248.0 ± 37 mg.

A serine protease was determined by de novo mass spectrometry-based sequencing.

References

Further reading
Hoge AR (1966). "Preliminary account on Neotropical Crotalinae (Serpentes: Viperidae)". Memórias do Instituto Butantan 32 [1965]: 109–184. (Bothrops moojeni, new species).

moojeni
Snakes of South America
Reptiles of Argentina
Reptiles of Bolivia
Reptiles of Brazil
Reptiles of Paraguay
Reptiles described in 1966
Taxa named by Alphonse Richard Hoge